The TMB-1,TMB-2, and TMSB were a round Soviet minimum metal anti-tank mines used during the Second World War. Both mines were similar in design, differing only in size, with the TMB-2 being the larger.

The mines bodies were constructed from asphalt impregnated cardboard with internal wooden slats for strengthening. A central glass pressure plug sat over an MV-5 pressure fuse. Downward force of about 26 pounds (115 newtons) causes the case to give way, triggering the mine.

The mine was normally employed in minefields mixed with metal-cased anti-tank mines. The mines were also easy to fit with anti-handling devices.

Specifications

References
 TM 5-223,Foreign Mine Warfare Equipment
 
 
 

Anti-tank mines
Land mines of the Soviet Union